The Ood are an alien species with telepathic abilities from the long-running science fiction series Doctor Who. In the series' narrative, they live in the distant future (circa 42nd century).

The Ood are portrayed as a slave race, naturally gentle and kind but readily susceptible to corrupting external influence. They are later emancipated from their slavery and by "The End of Time" have progressed into an advanced civilization.

Physical characteristics
The Ood are humanoid in appearance with tentacles on the lower portions of their faces. The Ood are a telepathic race; as such, they require a "translation sphere" to communicate with non-telepathic creatures. The sphere is connected to the Ood via a tube that originally connected their external brains to their body. Humans in the future would physically remove their hind brains and fix the translator sphere where the brain used to be. There appears to be no sexual differentiation among the Ood, though the Doctor seems to be able to determine their sex. When Donna refers to a dying Ood as an "it", the Doctor replies that the Ood is "a 'he', not an 'it'". The Ood say they require no names or titles as they are connected to a hive mind and function as one unit, but they do have designations given to them by humans such as "Ood 1 Alpha 1" or "Ood Sigma" to differentiate them. The Doctor suggests in "Planet of the Ood" that Ood individuality is a result of the Ood Hive Mind expressing itself differently within each Ood, saying "Funny thing, the subconscious. Takes all sorts of shapes. Came out in the Red-Eye as revenge, came out in the Rabid Ood as anger, and then there was patience. All that intelligence and mercy focused on Ood Sigma." The Ood are empaths, sharing among themselves a low-level telepathic communication field. When reaching out with their telepathic fields, it can be heard as singing. This ability has made them susceptible to telepathic control, and in several episodes they are shown to be controlled by a stronger telepathic force. Oods are a part of the Silence's religious order. They also know the Doctor's name as they had sung it to him in "Planet of the Ood".

The Ood have purple blood.

History within Doctor Who

The Ood debut in the Series 2 episode "The Impossible Planet". They are used by humans as a slave race, performing all manner of menial tasks for the humans in the episode. They are described as offering themselves for servitude willingly, having no goals of their own except to be given orders and to serve. It is also claimed that they cannot look after themselves and that, if they do not receive orders, they pine away and die. The episode also alludes to a protest group called "Friends of the Ood" who oppose Ood slavery and seek to have them freed.

According to the Official Doctor Who Annual 2007, the Ood live on a planet in the Horsehead Nebula, where they were governed by a Hive Mind that was destroyed by human colonists. The BBC-authorised book Doctor Who: Creatures and Demons elaborates that the Ood came from the Ood Sphere. The Ood Sphere is close to the Sense Sphere planet, home to the Sensorites, who share a mental and physical similarity with the Ood. Without a hive mind, the Ood offered themselves to the human colonists and became a slave race.

The Tenth Doctor and Rose Tyler encounter fifty Ood accompanying a human-led expeditionary force in "The Impossible Planet". The empathic nature of the Ood made them susceptible to psychic possession by the Beast, who formed the Ood on the base into his "Legion". While possessed, the Ood's eyes changed color to red and they killed several humans by throwing their translation spheres at them and electrocuting them. At the end of the episode, the Doctor was forced to sacrifice all the surviving Ood to the black hole around the planet because he did not have time to save both them and the human crew.

The Ood return in the Series 4 episode "Planet of the Ood", where it is revealed that they are not born to serve but are an enslaved race. The Ood translation spheres actually replaced their hind brain which had contained their individual personalities. The Doctor successfully frees the Ood by releasing the Ood hive mind, which connects all the Ood with a telepathic link. The hive mind had been sequestered from the Ood for 200 years by Ood Operations, the corporation that processed the Ood slaves; however, the Ood known as Sigma, who appears as the personal servant of Ood Operations leader Halpen, has been advancing the Ood freedom, by slowly turning him into an Ood and lowering the barrier around the giant brain that links all Ood together. The possessed "red eyed" Ood reappear in this episode, running amok at the behest of the hive mind. After being freed, all Ood across the universe are returned to the Ood Sphere. While there, Ood Sigma refers to Donna Noble as "Doctor-Donna" and prophesizes that the Doctor's "song" will soon come to an end.

Ood Sigma returns as part of the 2008–10 specials in the episode "The Waters of Mars", where he appears at the end of the episode in an attempt to contact the Doctor.

The Ood also appear in the following episode, the two-part story "The End of Time". In this episode, the Doctor finally accepts Ood Sigma's message and returns to the Ood Sphere 100 years (in their time line) after having freed them in "Planet of the Ood". The Doctor discovers that the Ood's civilisation has advanced too rapidly, and that the Ood have developed the ability to see and project themselves through time itself. The Ood reveal that this is a consequence of time "bleeding", and the elders of the Ood show the Doctor the dreams and prophesies they have been seeing. At the end of part two, Ood Sigma appears again to the Doctor and gives him the encouragement to return to his TARDIS to complete his regeneration into the Eleventh Doctor. The End of Time also introduces an Ood Elder, who has an exposed brain, crescent-shaped ears and yellowish tentacles.

A single Ood referred to as Nephew appeared in the series six episode "The Doctor's Wife". Nephew is under the influence of an alien entity called House. Nephew is killed when the Doctor and Idris land a TARDIS console in the exact spot he was standing, vaporising him instantly. The Doctor remarks that Nephew was "another Ood I failed to save", a reference to his previous encounters. Nephew's eyes glow green when possessed, a change from the red in previous episodes.

In the mini episode "Death is the Only Answer", the scientist Albert Einstein is transformed into a red-eyed Ood after ingesting a mysterious liquid. The possessed Ood repeats the phrase "Death is the only answer" before being transformed back into Einstein.

A scene cut from "A Good Man Goes to War" would have seen the Doctor meeting up with Ood Sigma again. Russell T Davies is still credited at the end for the scene despite it being cut.

In the Pond Life series, a single Ood who had become lost in the TARDIS wanders out into Amy and Rory's house. The Ood acts as their butler for several days until the Doctor can pick it up and return it to the Ood Sphere.

An Ood appears in Survivors of the Flux, serving as Tecteun's assistant who is powering the next wave of the Flux to destroy the remaining universe. After Tecteun is killed by Swarm and Azure, he assists the Doctor in trying to alter the course of the Flux wave. 

The Ood were physically portrayed by actor Paul Kasey. The Ood Elder in The End of Time is voiced by Brian Cox, whilst all other Ood are voiced by Silas Carson.

Appearances

Television
"The Impossible Planet" / "The Satan Pit" (2006)
"Planet of the Ood" (2008)
"The End of Time" (2009–10)
"The Doctor's Wife" (2011)
Flux 
"Survivors of the Flux" (2021)
”The Vanquishers” (2021)

Cameos
"The Waters of Mars" (2009)
"The Magician's Apprentice" (2015)
"Face the Raven" (2015)
"Revolution of the Daleks" (2021)

Minisodes
"Death is the Only Answer" (2011)
Pond Life (2012)

References

External links
 

Doctor Who races
Fictional extraterrestrial life forms
Fictional telepaths
Fiction about the Horsehead Nebula
Television characters introduced in 2006

he:דוקטור הו - דמויות#אוד